The Colorado River toad (Incilius alvarius), formerly known as the Sonoran Desert toad, is found in northern Mexico and the southwestern United States. It exudes toxins from glands within its skin that have psychoactive properties.

Description
It has a smooth, leathery skin and is olive green or mottled brown in color. Just behind the large golden eye with horizontal pupil is a bulging kidney-shaped parotoid gland. Below this is a large circular pale green area which is the tympanum or ear drum. By the corner of the mouth there is a white wart and there are white glands on the legs. All these glands produce toxic secretions. Its call is described as, "a weak, low-pitched toot, lasting less than a second."

Dogs that have attacked toads have suffered paralysis or even death. Raccoons have learned to pull a toad away from a pond by the back leg, turn it on its back and start feeding on its belly, a strategy that keeps the raccoon well away from the poison glands. Unlike other vertebrates, this amphibian obtains water mostly by osmotic absorption across its abdomen. Toads in the family Bufonidae have a region of skin known as "the seat patch", which extends from mid abdomen to the hind legs and is specialized for rapid rehydration. Most of the rehydration is done through absorption of water from small pools or wet objects.

Distribution and habitat

The Colorado River toad is found in the lower Colorado River and the Gila River catchment areas, in New Mexico, Mexico, and much of southern Arizona. It is considered possibly extirpated from California. It lives in both desert and semi-arid areas throughout its range. It is semiaquatic and is often found in streams, near springs, in canals and drainage ditches, and under water troughs. The Colorado River toad is known to breed in artificial water bodies (e.g., flood control impoundments, reservoirs) and as a result, the distributions and breeding habitats of these species may have been recently altered in south central Arizona. It often makes its home in rodent burrows and is nocturnal.

Biology
The Colorado River toad is sympatric with the spadefoot toad (Scaphiopus spp.), Great Plains toad (Anaxyrus cognatus), red-spotted toad (Anaxyrus punctatus), and Woodhouse's toad (Anaxyrus woodhousei). Like many other toads, they are active foragers and feed on invertebrates, lizards, small mammals, and amphibians. The most active season for toads is May–September, due to greater rainfalls (needed for breeding purposes). The age of I. alvarius individuals in a population at Adobe Dam in Maricopa County, Arizona, ranged from 2 to 4 years; other species of toad have a lifespan of 4 to 5 years. The taxonomic affinities of I. alvarius remain unclear, but immunologically, it is similarly close to the boreas and valliceps groups.

Breeding
The breeding season starts in July, when the rainy season begins, and can last up to August. Normally, 1–3 days after the rain is when toads begin to lay eggs in ponds, slow-moving streams, temporary pools or man-made structures that hold water. Eggs are 1.6 mm in diameter, 5–7 mm apart, and encased in a long single tube of jelly with a loose but distinct outline. The female toad can lay up to 8,000 eggs.

Psychotropic uses
The toad's primary defense system is glands that produce a poison that may be potent enough to kill a grown dog. These parotoid glands also produce the 5-MeO-DMT and bufotenin (which is named after the Bufo genus of toads); both of these chemicals belong to the family of hallucinogenic tryptamines. 

When vaporized, a single deep inhalation of the poison produces strong psychoactive effects within 15 seconds. After inhalation, the user usually experiences a warm sensation, euphoria, and strong visual and auditory hallucinations, due to 5-MeO-DMT's high affinity for the 5-HT2 and 5-HT1A serotonin receptor subtypes.

Bufotenin is a chemical constituent in the secretions and eggs of several species of toads belonging to the genus Bufo, but the Colorado River toad (Incillius alvarius) is the only toad species in which bufotenin is present in large enough quantities for a psychoactive effect. Extracts of toad secretion, containing bufotenin and other bioactive compounds, have been used in some traditional medicines such as ch’an su (probably derived from Bufo gargarizans), which has been used medicinally for centuries in China, as a herbal remedy often illegally imported to the USA that can be prepared as a tea. 

The toad was "recurrently depicted in Mesoamerican art", which some authors have interpreted as indicating that the effects of ingesting Bufo secretions have been known in Mesoamerica for many years; however, others doubt that this art provides sufficient "ethnohistorical evidence" to support the claim.

In addition to bufotenin, Bufo secretions also contain digoxin-like cardiac glycosides, and ingestion of the poison can be fatal. Ingestion of Bufo toad toxins and eggs by humans has resulted in several reported cases of poisoning, some of which resulted in death. The first reported death associated with the ingestion of ch'an su was that of a young woman who consumed it as a prescribed (by a Chinese herbalist) Chinese herbal remedy mixed into a tea (an approximately 100ml bowl). Immediately upon ingesting the ch'an tea, the woman experienced vomiting, difficulty breathing, and gastric tenderness, which spurred her husband to take her to the emergency room, where she died two and a half hours after drinking the tea.

Contemporary reports indicate that bufotenin-containing toad toxins have been used as a street drug; that is, as a supposed aphrodisiac, ingested orally in the form of ch’an su, and as a psychedelic, by smoking or orally ingesting Bufo toad secretion or dried Bufo skins. The use of chan'su and love stone (a related toad toxin preparation used as an aphrodisiac in the West Indies) has resulted in several cases of poisoning and at least one death. The practice of orally ingesting toad secretions has been referred to in popular culture and in the scientific literature as "toad licking" and has drawn media attention. Albert Most published a booklet titled Bufo alvarius: The Psychedelic Toad of the Sonoran Desert in 1983 which explained how to extract and smoke the secretions.

Among the notable people who have spoken publicly about their experiences with the psychoactive agents in the poison are boxer Mike Tyson, comedian Chelsea Handler, podcaster Joe Rogan, television  personality Christina Haack, and motivational speaker Anthony Robbins.

On October 31, 2022 the United States National Park Service posted a warning on Facebook that people should not handle or lick the toad. Despite the warning's wide coverage in media, the post was made humorously and the Park Service has no records of people licking or otherwise harassing the toads in parks.

U.S. state laws

The substance, 5-MeO-DMT, which are often dried into crystals and smoked, found in the toxins the toad excretes when it is threatened is considered illegal in the United States, and categorized as a Schedule 1 substance, though law enforcement are increasingly less likely to enforce the laws with its growing popularity.

The toads received national attention in 1994 after The New York Times Magazine published an article about a California teacher who became the first person to be arrested for possessing secretion of the toads. Bufotenin had been outlawed in California since 1970.

In November 2007, a man in Kansas City, Missouri, was discovered with an I. alvarius toad in his possession, and charged with possession of a controlled substance after they determined he intended to use its secretions for recreational purposes. In Arizona, one may legally bag up to 10 toads with a fishing license, but it could constitute a criminal violation if it can be shown that one is in possession of this toad with the intent to smoke its secretions.

None of the U.S. states in which I. alvarius is or was indigenous – California, Arizona, and New Mexico – legally allows a person to remove the toad from the state. For example, the Arizona Game and Fish Department is clear about the law in Arizona: "An individual shall not...export any live wildlife from the state; 3. Transport, possess, offer for sale, sell, sell as live bait, trade, give away, purchase, rent, lease, display, exhibit, propagate...within the state."

In California, I. alvarius has been designated as "endangered" and possession of this toad is illegal. "It is unlawful to capture, collect, intentionally kill or injure, possess, purchase, propagate, sell, transport, import or export any native reptile or amphibian, or part thereof..."

Threatened species 
Due to the rising popularity in collecting this toad, compounded with other threats such as motorists running over them, and predators such as raccoons eating them, U.S. states such as New Mexico have listed them as "threatened" and that collecting I. alvarius is unlawful in those states.  Collecting these toads is also thought to cause stress to them, in particular during the process of "milking" where collectors rub the toads under the chin to cause it to secrete the poison in the form of a milky substance that is then scraped from the body of the toad. Robert Villa, who serves as president of the Tucson Herpetological Society, said in a 2022 New York Times interview, “There’s a perception of abundance, but when you begin to remove large numbers of a species, their numbers are going to collapse like a house of cards at some point."

Efforts to breed the toads in large quantities to offset their losses in the wild are criticized as potentially attracting predators to these areas, and creating a disease vector for pathogens such as chytrid fungus, which can then spread to devastate more of them in the wild. Synthetic forms of the drug that collectors seek in the toad poison are fairly easy to produce and may offset overcollection.

References

Further reading

External links
Arizona: Tucson Herpetological Society – pictures

alvarius
Amphibians of Mexico
Amphibians of the United States
Toad, Colorado River
Amphibians described in 1859
Taxa named by Charles Frédéric Girard
Biological sources of psychoactive drugs
Psychedelic tryptamine carriers